How to Win Millions Playing Slot Machines...or Lose Trying is a book with a satirical view of slot machines, written by Frank Legato and published in July, 2004 by Bonus Books. This book is a humorous look at slot machines but it does not mean that the author tries to speak about this game and its players as being unintelligent or unthinking. Frank Legato describes the world of slot machines (history, concept, how to play) in a funny and interesting manner.

References

External links
 How to Win Millions Playing Slot Machines...or Lose Trying at Bonus Books

2004 non-fiction books
Non-fiction books about gambling